Alyaksey Yanushkevich (born 15 January 1986) is a Belarusian professional footballer.

International career
Yanushkevich made his debut for the Belarus national football team on 15 November 2014, in a Euro 2016 qualifier against Spain, playing the full 90 minutes.

Honours
Shakhtyor Soligorsk
Belarusian Cup winner: 2013–14

References

External links

Profile at Shakhter website

1986 births
Living people
Belarusian footballers
Association football defenders
Belarus international footballers
FC Dinamo Minsk players
FC Torpedo-BelAZ Zhodino players
FC Shakhtyor Soligorsk players
FC Isloch Minsk Raion players
FC Vitebsk players
Footballers from Minsk